Curran Bluff is a bluff,  long, forming a part of the south coast of Joerg Peninsula, Bowman Coast, south of Reichle Mesa. It was photographed from the air by Lincoln Ellsworth, 21 November 1935, and was mapped from these photographs by W.L.G. Joerg. It was named by the Advisory Committee on Antarctic Names for Martin P. Curran, a member of the Pine Island Bay reconnaissance survey in USCGC Burton Island, 1974–75, and Project Manager, RV Hero – Palmer Station Research System, 1976.

References 

Cliffs of Graham Land
Bowman Coast